Michael Jagger may refer to:

 Mick Jagger (Sir Michael Philip Jagger, born 1943), English musician, singer, songwriter and actor
 Michael Jagger, a fictional spy in the novels of William Garner

See also
 Michael Jäger (disambiguation)